Hyde County Airport  is a county-owned, public-use airport in Hyde County, North Carolina, United States. It is located seven nautical miles (8 mi, 13 km) north of the central business district of Engelhard, North Carolina. This airport is included in the National Plan of Integrated Airport Systems for 2011–2015, which categorized it as a general aviation facility.

Facilities and aircraft 
Hyde County Airport covers an area of 387 acres (157 ha) at an elevation of 8 feet (2 m) above mean sea level. It has one runway designated 11/29 with an asphalt surface measuring 4,700 by 100 feet (1,433 x 30 m). For the 12-month period ending September 19, 2009, the airport had 4,050 aircraft operations, an average of 11 per day: 86% general aviation, 12% military, and 1% air taxi.

References

External links 
  at North Carolina DOT airport guide
 Aerial image as of March 1993 from USGS The National Map
 

Airports in North Carolina
Transportation in Hyde County, North Carolina
Buildings and structures in Hyde County, North Carolina